Henry Lloyd (February 21, 1852 – December 30, 1920) was the 40th Governor of Maryland in the United States from 1885 to 1888. He was born in 1852 in Dorchester County, Maryland and died in 1920 in Cambridge, Maryland. He was a grandson of Maryland Governor Edward Lloyd.

Early life
Henry Lloyd was born in Dorchester County, Maryland on February 21, 1852, the son of Daniel Lloyd and Kitty Henry Lloyd. He was descended from Edward Lloyd, who had served as Colonial Governor in 1709, and from Edward Lloyd V, the Governor in 1809. He was a descendant on his mother's side of John Henry, the first United States Senator from the Eastern Shore and Governor between 1797 and 1798.  He graduated from Cambridge Academy in 1871, then began his career by teaching school. He began the study of law in the office of his uncles Daniel Maynadier Henry, then Congressman from the Eastern Shore, and Judge Charles P. Goldsborough. He was admitted to the bar in 1873.

Personal life
On October 18, 1886, he married Mary Elizabeth Staplefort, and they had one son.

Career
In 1881, he was elected a member of the Maryland State Senate from Dorchester County, being elected its President in the Legislative Session of 1884.  He then became the acting governor on March 27, 1885, when Robert M. McLane resigned to become Minister to France. He continued as such until January 1886, when the Legislature votes 100 of 114 ballots for him to be Governor. He was inaugurated on January 21, 1886, to serve until January 11, 1888.

Following his term as governor, Lloyd resumed his law practice in Cambridge, Maryland. He was then elected for the full 15-year term as an Associate Judge of the First Judicial Circuit in 1893.

Death
Lloyd died at his home in Cambridge on December 30, 1920. He is buried at the Christ Church Episcopal Cemetery in Cambridge.

References

1852 births
1920 deaths
Democratic Party governors of Maryland
Presidents of the Maryland State Senate
Democratic Party Maryland state senators
American people of Welsh descent
People from Dorchester County, Maryland
People from Cambridge, Maryland
Lloyd family of Maryland
Burials in Maryland
19th-century American politicians